Kate Shaw is a professor of law at the Yeshiva University Benjamin N. Cardozo School of Law, a Supreme Court contributor for ABC News, and co-host of the podcast Strict Scrutiny.

Education 
Shaw earned her Bachelor of Arts magna cum laude from Brown University where she majored in religious and gender studies. She then earned her Juris Doctor magna cum laude and Order of the Coif from Northwestern University Pritzker School of Law, where she was Editor-in-Chief of the Northwestern University Law Review and won the John Paul Stevens Award while there.

Career
After graduating in 2006 from Northwestern University Pritzker School of Law, Shaw clerked for Judge Richard A. Posner in the U.S. Court of Appeals for the Seventh Circuit and then for U.S. Supreme Court to Justice John Paul Stevens. From 2009 to 2011, Shaw worked at the White House Counsel’s Office during the Obama Administration. Shaw has been a member of the Cardozo School of Law faculty since 2011, where she teaches Administrative Law, Constitutional Law, and courses on the Supreme Court, legislation, antitrust, and gender and reproductive rights. She is a member of the Administrative Conference of the United States (ACUS) and the National Task Force on Election Crises.

Media commentary
Professor Shaw has worked for ABC News as an analyst of the Supreme Court since 2015. Her legal and political commentary has also appeared in publications including the New York Times, The Atlantic, and the Washington Post. Shaw has commented on shifts in American jurisprudence, political machinations in Washington and national security, and Supreme Court affairs. In an interview by New York Times podcast correspondent Ezra Klein in July 2022, Shaw explained the historical rightward shift in jurisprudence and conservative political strategies that led to the current ultraconservative Supreme Court.

During the Trump administration, Shaw commented on various forms of legal jeopardy faced by the then-President: legal challenges to president's substantive policy initiatives (e.g., DACA, the Muslim travel ban, and environmental policy changes); investigations into members of the cabinet and White House staff; and Trump's personal legal exposure, in a podcast interview. She also wrote about the dangers of Trump's political speech leading up to the 2020 election, and about the causes of the January 6th riots.

Shaw has co-hosted the podcast Strict Scrutiny, along with fellow legal academics Leah Litman and  Melissa Murray, since 2019. The podcast analyzes and critiques recent Supreme Court cases, providing historical context and political commentary on the likely impacts of the Court's decisions. In 2022, the podcast joined the Crooked Media network.

Scholarship
Shaw is a prolific legal scholar and her work has appeared in law journals such as Cornell Law Review, Columbia Law Review, Michigan Law Review, Georgetown Law Journal, Texas Law Review, and Northwestern University Law Review.

In a recent article, Shaw criticized the United States Electoral College for its distorting effects on democracy, laid out possible reforms, and argued for its abolishment. In other commentary, Shaw has argued that the January 6 riots would not have taken place in the absence of the Electoral College.

Shaw has also written about gender and reproductive rights. She recently co-edited a book about judicial decisions on reproductive rights, including cases related to pregnancy, abortion and forced sterilization. Among other subjects, she has also written about felony disenfranchisement in Florida and campaign finance disclosure.

Personal life
Shaw met Chris Hayes, now a reporter at MSNBC, when they were both undergraduates at Brown University, and they married in 2007. Shaw and Hayes lived in Washington, D.C., before moving to New York City, where All In with Chris Hayes is produced. They have three children.

Her father is veteran Chicago reporter Andy Shaw, who also worked for ABC News.

References

Living people
American legal scholars
American women legal scholars
American women academics
Brown University alumni
Yeshiva University faculty
Cardozo School of Law faculty
Northwestern University Pritzker School of Law alumni
American podcasters
American women podcasters
Women podcasters
Year of birth missing (living people)